Columbus' Last Appeal to Queen Isabella is a statuary group which was previously installed in the California State Capitol in Sacramento in 1883. It was the work of Larkin Goldsmith Mead (1835-1910). The statues were removed in 2020.

See also

 List of monuments and memorials removed during the George Floyd protests
 List of monuments and memorials to Christopher Columbus

References

Monuments and memorials in California
Monuments and memorials removed during the George Floyd protests
Sculptures of men in California
Sculptures of women in California
Statues in California
Statues of Christopher Columbus
Statues of Isabella I of Castile